Kima, Keisha, and Pam is the second studio album by American R&B girl group Total. It was released by Bad Boy Records and Arista Records on October 27, 1998, in the United States. The album debuted at number nine on the US Top R&B/Hip-Hop Albums and peaked at number thirty-nine on the US Billboard 200. In 1999, the album was certified Gold by the Recording Industry Association of America (RIAA) for excess of selling 500,000 copies. To date, it is their most recent album.

Background
Original producer of "Truth Or Dare (Interlude)," Mario Winans re-produced it as a full-length track "Dolly Baby" for rapper Lil' Cease's 1999 album "The Wonderful World of Cease-a-Leo", also using a sample of Pam's vocals from the Interlude as its chorus. Despite it being a sample, she is also listed under vocals in the album's credits.

Critical reception

In his review for Entertainment Weekly Matt Diehl wrote that "Total don’t get quite bad enough on their sophomore release, Kima, Keisha, and Pam. Despite all the heavy breathing, the diva trio’s pillow talk peters out. However, bed-board-bangin’ beats from Missy Elliott, Timbaland, Heavy D, and the Puff master himself turn this into a partial, if not total, bump-and-grind masterpiece." Allmusic editor Michael Gallucci found that "by inviting a who's-who roster into the tub with them [Total] are barely heard. Brimming with the sounds of the world around it, Kima, Keisha & Pam is a studio-powered album that loses its individuality while trying desperately to be a part of the streets and scene. The best track, "Trippin'," is an Elliott-produced slice of robotic R&B that combines the gals' sweet harmonies with state-of-the-soul-art studio savvy. But an album's worth of the sexy same unveils Total's ultimate limitations."

Track listing

Notes
 denotes co-producer
Samples credits
"If You Want Me" sampled "Put Your Hands Where My Eyes Can See" by Busta Rhymes, which sampled "Sweet Green Fields" By Seals and Crofts. 
"Press Rewind" sampled "Little Child, Runnin Wild" by Curtis Mayfield  
"Rain"  sampled "A Garden of Peace" by Lonnie Liston Smith and "Dead Presidents" by Jay-Z
"Sitting Home" sampled "Forget I Was a "G"" by Whitehead Bros.
"What About Us" (Remix) sampled "Hobo Scratch" by Malcolm McLaren and World's Famous Supreme Team

Credits

Charles "Prince Charles" Alexander – Engineer
Billy B. – Make-Up
Ariel Borujow – Assistant Engineer
Ali Boudris – Engineer, Guitar
Warryn Campbell – Producer
Drew Coleman – Engineer
Sean "Puffy" Combs – Executive Producer, Producer
Johnny Dangerous – Programming
C.J. DeVillar – Engineer
Tony Dofat – Engineer
Jimmy Douglass – Mixing
Missy Elliott – Associate Executive Producer, Performer, Producer, Vocal Arrangement, Vocals
Rasheed Goodlowe – Assistant Engineer
Mick Guzauski – Mixing
Andy Haller – Assistant Engineer
Heavy D – Producer
Steve Jordan – Producer
Garrett Blake Smith – Producer
Kris Kello – Arranger, Keyboards, Producer, Programming, Vocals (Background)
Jess Klein – Composer
Jack Knight – Vocal Arrangement
Shannon "Slam" Lawrence Engineer
Paul Logus – Engineer, Mixing
Mario Lucy – Engineer

Mase – Performer
Tony Maserati – Engineer, Mixing
Michael McCoy – Engineer
Mocha – Performer
Lynn Montrose – Engineer
Rob Murphy – Assistant Engineer
Michael Patterson – Mixing
Rob Paustian – Engineer
Joe "Smilin' Joe" Perrera – Engineer, Mixing
Harve Pierre – A&R, Associate Executive Producer, Producer, Vocal Producer
Herb Powers – Mastering
Ed Raso – Engineer
Norman Jean Roy – Photography
Tony Smalios – Engineer
Erica Spivey – Vocals
Aaron Sprague – Assistant Engineer
Toni Swan – Hair Stylist
Carl Thomas – Performer
Gerard Thomas – Multi Instruments, Producer
Carl Thompson – Producer
Timbaland – Multi Instruments, Producer
Total – Vocals, Vocals (Background)
Diane Warren – Executive Producer
Mario Winans – Producer
Chad Wolfinabarger – Engineer

Charts

Weekly charts

Year-end charts

Certifications

References

1998 albums
Albums produced by Missy Elliott
Albums produced by Sean Combs
Albums produced by Timbaland
Albums produced by Warryn Campbell
Bad Boy Records albums
Total (group) albums